Tanvi Khanna (born 23 July 1996) is an Indian female professional squash player and is a regular member of the Indian squash team. She is currently the fourth highest ranked player in the national rankings and is regarded as one of the finest squash players to have emerged from India. She also plays for Columbia Lions squash team which belongs to the Columbia University. She achieved her highest PSA world ranking of 86 in September 2021 and broke into the top 100 for the first time during the 2019-20 PSA World Tour.

Career 
She made her maiden Asian Games appearance at the 2018 Asian Games representing India and clinched a silver medal in the women's team event. She also participated at the 2019 Women's Asian Individual Squash Championships and reached quarter-finals. She lost to fellow national squash player Joshna Chinappa in the quarterfinals.

Tanvi Khanna also represents Columbia Lions in Ivy League and was named first team All-Ivy League for three consecutive years from 2016-2018.
South Asian Games 2018 Nepal Gold medallist in the individual event.

References

External links 
 
 

1996 births
Living people
Sportswomen from Delhi
Racket sportspeople from Delhi
Indian female squash players
Asian Games medalists in squash
Asian Games silver medalists for India
Squash players at the 2018 Asian Games
Medalists at the 2018 Asian Games
South Asian Games gold medalists for India
South Asian Games medalists in squash
Columbia Lions women's squash players
Columbia University alumni
Indian expatriates in the United States
21st-century Indian women
21st-century Indian people